The Sapugaskanda Refinery (also referred to as Sapugaskanda Oil Refinery) is the single largest oil refinery of Sri Lanka. (Medium sour crude oil) It was commissioned on 12 October 1969.

As with most refineries, the Sapugaskanda Refinery has an in-house utilities section which supplies electricity, water, steam, instrument air, and other necessities for operations. A further four crude oil tanks located in the separate Orugodawatta tank farm.

History 
 The initial survey for the refinery was conducted in 1963.
 On 9 May 1967, the foundation stone was laid for the refinery. Construction was handled by Snamprogetti, while the facility supervision was handled by UOP LLC.
 On 12 October 1969, the refinery was commissioned.
 In 1971, the naphtha merox unit was modified to commence production of liquefied natural gas (LNG), while SBPS production was also commenced with existing infrastructure.
 In 1981, a kerosene merox was installed to process A-1 jet fuel, while the energy-intensive Kerosene unifiner was decommissioned.
 In 1992, the crude distiller unit was again modified to support far Eastern crude oils such as Miri light crude oil, and Naphtha unifiner capacity was increased to 1100 tonne per day.
 In 1999, platformer unit was modified to increase capacity to 650 tonne per day, to meet increasing gasoline demand, and to phase out lead in gasoline. 
 In 2003, the kerosene unifiner was modified to process diesel, and the existing gas oil unifiner was rehabilitated to meet the sulphur specification of 0.3%wt in diesel.
 On 19 February 2018, the entire facility was shutdown for 35 days due to a planned refurbishment project. 1,200 engineers and mechanics handled the 24×7 maintenance covering the processing units, utilities, and tank farm. The production shortage during the period was covered by importing the requirements by the Ceylon Petroleum Corporation.

Power stations 
Three oil-fired power stations are built at the vicinity of the refinery for ease of fuel logistics: 
 Sapugaskanda Power Station (160 MW) - Owned by the Ceylon Electricity Board
 Lakdhanavi Power Station (24 MW) - Owned by Lakdhanavi (Private) Limited
 Asia Power Sapugaskanda Power Station (51 MW) - Owned by Asia Power (Private) Limited

See also 
 Energy in Sri Lanka
 Hambantota Refinery

References 

Oil refineries in Sri Lanka
Buildings and structures in Gampaha District
Buildings and structures completed in 1969
1969 establishments in Ceylon